Volleyball competitions at the 2019 Pan American Games in Lima, Peru are scheduled to be held from August 2 to 11. The venue for the competition is the Sports Centre VRDC located at the Villa Deportiva Regional del Callao cluster. The venue will also host the taekwondo competitions. A total of eight men's and eight women's teams (each consisting up to 12 athletes) competed in each tournament. This means a total of 192 athletes are scheduled to compete.

Qualification
A total of eight men's teams and eight women's team qualified to compete at the games in each tournament. The host nation (Peru) received automatic qualification in both tournaments. All other teams qualified through various tournaments. The North and South American qualification tournaments were held with teams competing (and not qualifying) at the respective Pan American Cups, plus any possible invited teams. The last slot could also be awarded to a team.

Men

Women

Participating nations
Eleven countries qualified volleyball teams. The numbers of participants qualified are in parentheses.

Medalists

See also
Volleyball at the 2020 Summer Olympics

References

External links
Results book

 
Volleyball
Volleyball
2019 in volleyball
International volleyball competitions hosted by Peru